Cambridge University Air Squadron, abbreviated CUAS, formed in 1925, is the training unit of the Royal Air Force at the University of Cambridge and forms part of the Royal Air Force Volunteer Reserve. It is the oldest of 15 University Air Squadrons in the UK. For many years it was based at Cambridge Airport at Teversham.

History
The unit was formed in 1925 and initially operated out a runway located next to RAF Engineering school at Fen causeway in Cambridge. After a brief spell at RAF Duxford, the squadron moved in 1949 to a new home at Cambridge "Marshall's" or "Teversham" Airport where it remained until 1999 and its transfer away to RAF Wyton. 15 years later, the squadron was moved again, to RAF Wittering.

Present day
 
Cambridge University Air Squadron offers basic flying training and adventure training to undergraduates and graduates and encourages members to take up a career as an officer in one of the branches of the Royal Air Force.

Student members hold the title of Officer Cadet, which carries the privileges, but not the rank, of a commissioned officer. The four senior student members of the squadron are granted commissions in the RAF Volunteer Reserve, with the rank of Acting Pilot Officer. Officer Cadets are required to attend a minimum of one training night a week during full term, usually a lecture by a guest speaker on an aspect of the Royal Air Force or another military unit. They are also expected to take part in two weeks of continuous training during the Long Vacation. There are also camps during all university vacations for sports, flying and adventure training.

CUAS is based at RAF Wittering a station which they share with the University of London Air Squadron, and is equipped with Grob Tutor T Mk 1s. Each officer cadet is offered a Summer Holiday Attachment of one week at another RAF base, seconded to an active regular unit.

The Hack Trophy 
The Hack Trophy is awarded annually to the University Air Squadron for best all-round performance covering flying training, flying standards and competitions, ground school training, organisation and administration. Cambridge UAS won the trophy in 1970, 1974, 1975 (the year in which the squadron celebrated its 50th anniversary as the first-formed UAS) and 1977 (runner-up in 1976).

Commanding officers (incomplete)
 1934–1937 Squadron Leader John Stanley Chick
 1971–1974 Squadron Leader Dick Joyce
 1974–1977 Squadron Leader John Nutkins 
 1977–1980 Squadron Leader John Kennedy
 1980–1982 Squadron Leader Brian Burridge
 1982–1985 Squadron Leader Matt Buzby
 2007–2009 Squadron Leader John Monahan
 2009–2011 Squadron Leader Simon Means
 2011–2014 Squadron Leader Charles Kane
 2014 – 2021 Squadron Leader Richard Kellett
 2021 - present Squadron Leader Mark Hammond

Notable members
 George Barclay RAF Officer and DFC recipient
 Kenneth Campbell RAF Officer and Victoria Cross recipient
 John Fairey Aviator
 Alick Foord-Kelcey RAF Officer and civil servant
 Victor Goddard RAF Officer
 Gordon Manley Climatologist
 Hector Monro, Baron Monro of Langholm RAF Officer & politician
 James Peter Obeyesekere III Sri Lankan politician
 Nicholas Patrick Astronaut
 Michael Stear RAF Officer
 Richard Tomlinson Soldier & MI6 Officer
 Peter Vanneck RN Officer
 Gino Watkins Polar Explorer
 Frank Whittle RAF Officer and inventor of the turbo-jet engine
 Cathcart Wight-Boycott RAF Officer

References

Air of Authority - University Air Squadrons

Royal Air Force university air squadrons
Organisations associated with the University of Cambridge
Military units and formations established in 1925